Death Rave 2000 is a various artists compilation album released on September 28, 1993 by 21st Circuitry.

Reception
Factsheet Five praised the authenticity of Death Rave 2000 and its fusion of disco and industrial music, calling the album "a happy medium between the two extreme forms of electronic music." A critic at Option said "this compilation seems like a simulacrum of what a collection of good, aggressive rave tracks should be."

Track listing

Personnel
Adapted from the Death Rave 2000 liner notes.

 Atro.City – illustrations
 Peter Eckart – mastering
 tara ntula – illustrations

Release history

References

External links 
 

1993 compilation albums
Techno compilation albums
21st Circuitry compilation albums